Tirumalpur is an important temple town and a suburb of Kanchipuram, Tamil Nadu. It is also an important suburban train station along the south west line of Chennai Suburban Railway.
The place is famous for the historic Thirumarperu Shiva temple.Tirumalpur is located 78 kms away from the State Capital Chennai. Upcoming Chennai Greenfield airport is to be located near Parandur, which is 10 kms from Tirumalpur Suburban Railway Station. It is the part of Arakkonam taluk of Ranipet district.

References

Villages in Kanchipuram district